Pedro Lino Iyanga Bama (born 15 June 1982 in Bata), known as Lino, is an Equatoguinean football defender. He currently plays for the CP Parla Escuela in the Spanish Preferente de la Comunidad de Madrid (Group 2).

Career

International career
Lino played for the Equatorial Guinea national team in the 2002 FIFA World Cup qualification (CAF).

Career statistics

References

External links

soccerdata.net
Fútbol Estadísticas 

1982 births
Living people
People from Bata, Equatorial Guinea
Equatoguinean footballers
Association football defenders
Divisiones Regionales de Fútbol players
Equatorial Guinea international footballers
Equatoguinean expatriate footballers
Equatoguinean expatriate sportspeople in Spain
Expatriate footballers in Spain
Internacional de Madrid players